The Singles Collection is a compilation album by English musician David Bowie, released in 1993 in the UK and (with some changes) as The Singles 1969 to 1993 in the United States. A video companion, Bowie – The Video Collection, was released on VHS at the same time.

Release
Released in late 1993, this "singles" collection included some tracks that were never officially released as singles (such as "Ziggy Stardust"). This release marked the first time some 7"/single edits were available on CD, and included some unusual or rare versions, such as the shortened mixes of "TVC 15", "Space Oddity" and "Loving the Alien". The US release included the full-length original version of Bowie's "Cat People (Putting Out Fire)" and the 4:01 remix of "Under Pressure" from Classic Queen, while the UK version instead includes a 3:58 edit originally found on Queen's Greatest Hits II.

The first 40,000 copies of the US CD release included a third disc containing a single track, "Peace on Earth/Little Drummer Boy", a duet by Bowie and Bing Crosby taken from Bing's 1977 Christmas television special.

Track listing
All songs written by David Bowie except where noted.

UK version
(*) = not on the U.S. version

U.S. version
(*) = Not on the UK version

Charts

Weekly charts

Year-end charts

Certifications and sales

References

Sources

David Bowie compilation albums
1993 compilation albums
EMI Records compilation albums
Rykodisc compilation albums